This is a list of lighthouses in Honduras.

Lighthouses

See also
 Lists of lighthouses and lightvessels

References

External links
 

Honduras
Lighthouses
Lighthouses
 *